The Chile national football team represents Chile in men's international football competitions and is controlled by the Federación de Fútbol de Chile which was established in 1895. The team is commonly referred to as La Roja ("The Red One"). Chile has appeared in nine World Cup tournaments and were hosts of the 1962 FIFA World Cup where they finished in third place, the highest position the country has ever achieved in the World Cup.

Chile won their first Copa América title on home soil at the 2015 Copa América, defeating Argentina in the final. They successfully defended their title in another final against Argentina won on penalties at Copa América Centenario the following year in the United States. Prior to this, Chile had been runners-up in the competition on four occasions. As a result of winning the 2015 Copa América, they qualified for the 2017 FIFA Confederations Cup, where they finished second, behind Germany, in their debut appearance.

History

The Federación de Fútbol de Chile is the second oldest South American federation, having been founded in Valparaíso on 19 June 1895. Chile was one of the four founding member nations of CONMEBOL. Together with Argentina, Brazil, and Uruguay, the four competed in the first South American Championship, later to be renamed the Copa América, in 1916. On 12 October 1926, Chile made the first corner-kick goal in Copa América history in a match against Bolivia. Chile was one of the thirteen national teams that competed in the inaugural World Cup in 1930. The team started off well, beating Mexico and France without conceding a goal. A 3–1 loss to Argentina in the final game left the Chilean team in second place within the group, eliminating it from the tournament.  In the 1950 World Cup, Chile defeated the United States, 5–2, but nevertheless was eliminated in the first round.

The best Chilean result in the World Cup was third place in 1962, as the host nation. Chile lost 4–2 to eventual champion Brazil in a semi-final but went on to defeat Yugoslavia 1–0 to earn third place. Chilean players made two World Cup firsts: the first player to miss a World Cup penalty kick was the Chilean Guillermo Subiabre, in a 1930 FIFA World Cup match against France, and Carlos Caszely of Chile became the first player to be sent off with a red card, during a match against West Germany at the 1974 World Cup.

A scandal known as "El Maracanazo" occurred on 3 September 1989. At a 1990 FIFA World Cup qualifying match at Rio de Janeiro's Maracanã stadium, Brazil led Chile 1–0 and La Roja needed to win. Chilean goalkeeper Roberto Rojas fell to the pitch with an apparent injury to his forehead. A firework had been thrown from the stands by a Brazilian fan named Rosenery Mello do Nascimento and was smouldering about a yard away. After Rojas was carried off the pitch, the Chilean players and coaches claimed that conditions were not safe and they refused to return, so the match was abandoned. However, video footage of the match showed that the firework had not made contact with Rojas. FIFA forfeited the game to Brazil, Chile was banned from the qualifiers for the 1994 FIFA World Cup, and Rojas was banned for life, although an amnesty was granted in 2001.

On 19 July 2007, the Chilean Football Federation banned six of the national team players, because of "internal indiscipline" during the Copa América tournament, for 20 international matches each as they destroyed the team hotel property while drunk. The players banned were captain Jorge Valdivia, defenders Álvaro Ormeño, Rodrigo Tello, Jorge Vargas, Pablo Contreras and striker Reinaldo Navia. Nelson Acosta's resignation as manager came after Chile were knocked out of the 2007 Copa América. After serving 10 matches from the ban, all players aside from Ormeño sent a letter of apology acknowledging their actions which lifted the ban. Chile had qualified to the quarter-finals after a 3–2 win against Ecuador, and a 0–0 draw against Mexico. But two losses, one of those being a 6–1 defeat against Brazil, sealed Acosta's fate. Former Argentina manager Marcelo Bielsa was given the task of becoming the Chile national team manager in preparation for the 2010 World Cup qualifiers.

On 16 October 2008, Chile beat Argentina 1–0 for the first time in a qualifying competition, making history. Marcelo Bielsa was acclaimed for this accomplishment by both Chilean and Argentinian people. This match was seen as one of the reasons that ended Alfio Basile's tenure as the Argentina coach.

After finishing in second place of the CONMEBOL qualifiers for the 2010 FIFA World Cup held in South Africa and reaching the round of 16 at the tournament, head coach Marcelo Bielsa extended his contract with the Chile national team until 2015.
Bielsa stated that he would leave his position if Jorge Segovia were elected as President of the Chilean Football Board. He followed through on this threat, despite Segovia's election being annulled, and resigned in February 2011. Claudio Borghi then became Chile's manager in March 2011.

After a string of bad performances and harsh criticisms, Claudio Borghi stepped down as Chile's manager in November 2012. A new manager, Jorge Sampaoli, was appointed in December 2012. A disciple of Marcelo Bielsa, Jorge Sampaoli broke new records for La Roja by winning 10, drawing 3, and losing only 3 of 15 games as the head of the Chile national team.

With Sampaoli, Chile were able to qualify for 2014 FIFA World Cup, reaching to the round of 16, where Chile lost to Brazil in penalties.

In the 2015 Copa América, Chile won their first game against Ecuador, with 2–0 being the score. In their second game, Chile drew against Mexico. Chile advanced to the knockout stage as Group A winners with 7 points and most goals scored of any team in the tournament (10). Then they beat Uruguay in the quarterfinals and Peru in the semifinals. In the final, Chile defeated Argentina on penalties (4–1) after a 0–0 draw, to win their first Copa America title.

In January 2016, just six months after winning the 2015 Copa America, Jorge Sampaoli stepped down as Chile's manager.  A new manager, the Argentinean Juan Antonio Pizzi, was appointed at the end of the same month, who then led La Roja to a second Copa America Centenario 2016 victory after again beating Argentina in the final.

In the 2017 FIFA Confederations Cup held in Russia, for which they had qualified by winning the Copa America, Chile won their first group stage match against Cameroon with 2–0 being the score. In their second match against the Germany, Chile drew after a hard match and both team scored 1. In their final game of the group stage against Australia, Chile drew once again but qualified to the knockout stage on virtue of having more points than Australia, though having less points than Germany. In the semis, after a tense and exciting match, Chile came out on top, beating Portugal on Penalties, 3–0 and hence they qualified for the 2017 FIFA Confederations Cup Final. In their first ever final in a FIFA-sanctioned tournament, Chile faced Germany and lost 1–0.

On 10 October 2017, after losing 3–0 to Brazil, Chile failed to qualify for the 2018 FIFA World Cup in Russia, causing an end to what was perceived as their "golden generation". They ended up being the highest ranked team that failed to qualify at 9th, placing sixth in the round-robin after losing out on overall goal difference to Peru, the number of points being equal.

Team image
The team kit consists of a red jersey, blue shorts, and white socks. The away jersey features a white jersey, white shorts, and blue socks. The color scheme of red, white, and blue that was featured in the 1947 South American Championship, the precursor of the Copa América, has remained in place since. In 2016, red shorts were introduced as an option for the first time.

In August 2010, Puma acquired the contract to be the official kit supplier for the Chilean team from 2011 to 2015, paying US$ 3 million per year, also providing referees' kits and balls for domestic club competitions. The previous kit supplier, from 2004 to 2010 including the 2010 World Cup, was Brooks Sports.

Puma company ended its link after the 2015 Copa América with the tender for the new brand that will outfit the team since August 2015. This procedure was won by the American company Nike. The contract with Nike was supposed to last until the 2022 FIFA World Cup, but ended prematurely when the Chilean Football Federation sued Nike for missing payments in 2021. This dispute lead to Chile blocking the Nike patch with a flag during the 2021 Copa América. On 1 September 2021, Adidas were announced as the national team kit supplier until 2026.

Home stadium

The Chile national team plays their qualifying matches at the Estadio Nacional Julio Martínez Prádanos located in Santiago, Chile and can be found at the commune of Ñuñoa. The construction of the stadium began in February 1937, and opened on 3 December 1938. The current official registered capacity is of 49,000 spectators, but has surpassed the 75,000 mark on many occasions when the match is of high demand. An example would be the 1962 FIFA World Cup semi-final match Chile vs. Brazil, where over 76,000 spectators viewed the game. The maximum attendance ever was 85,262 on 26 December 1962, for a game between Universidad Católica and Universidad de Chile.

It has hosted four Copa América finals, the final of the 1962 FIFA World Cup and the final to the 1987 FIFA World Youth Championship.

Rivalries 

Chile has no special rivalry, however, two matches are considered important: those against Argentina, and Peru.

Argentina 
With 90 games played, is the most played fixture in the history of the Chile national team and the third most played for Argentina after their encounters with Uruguay and Brazil. The teams' first meeting was in Buenos Aires on 27 May 1910, and matches always draw large crowds in Chile. Only 1 of the 6 victories on the 90 games played, was in an official competition, which occurred in 2010 World Cup qualification, until the 2015 and 2016 Copa America finals which were won by penalty shoot-outs.

Peru 

The Chile–Peru football rivalry is known in Spanish as the Clásico del Pacífico ("Pacific Derby").  The rivalry is considered to be one of the fiercest rivalries in the world, with CNN World Sport editor Greg Duke ranking it among the top ten football rivalries in the world. The rivalry between Chile and Peru stems from historical politics, border disputes, and the War of the Pacific, with the rivalry producing some of the most intense matches in South American footballing history.

Chile first faced Peru in the 1935 South American Championship, losing 1–0.

Brazil 
Although it is a dominating rivalry for Brazil, both teams have had matches in the last three Chilean World Cup appearances, all of them in the round of 16 knock out stage. France 1998, South Africa 2010, Brazil 2014. In Brazil 2014 the match was a 1-1, and in the last second of extra time Mauricio Pinilla's shot hit the crossbar. Brazil won 3–2 in the penalty shootout.

Sponsors
 Coca-Cola/Powerade (since 1962 FIFA World Cup/2020)
 Cerveza Cristal (since 2007)
 Adidas (since 2021)
 BCI (since 2023)
 Chilevisión (TV broadcaster of Chile's qualifying and friendly matches) (since 2023–2026)

Kit suppliers

Results and fixtures

2022

2023

Coaching staff

Players

Current squad
The following players were called up to the squad for the friendly match against Paraguay on 28 March 2023.

Caps and goals updated as of 20 November 2022, after the match against Slovakia.

Recent call-ups
The following players have been called up in the last twelve months.

COV Withdrew from the squad due to quarantine or infection by COVID-19
INJ Withdrew from the squad due to injury
PRE Preliminary squad
SUS Withdrew from the squad due to suspension
 WD Withdrew from the squad for non-injury related reasons.

Player records

Players in bold are still active with Chile.

Most appearances

Top goalscorers

Competitive record

FIFA World Cup

 Champions   Runners-up   Third place   Fourth place

Copa América

FIFA Confederations Cup

Olympic Games

Pan American Games

Honours

Senior team

Titles 
 FIFA World Cup
 Third place (1): 1962
 South American Championship/Copa América
Winners (2): 2015, 2016
 Runners-up (4): 1955, 1956, 1979, 1987
 Third place (5): 1926, 1941, 1945, 1967, 1991
 Fourth place (11): 1916, 1917, 1919, 1920, 1924, 1935, 1939, 1947, 1953, 1999, 2019
 FIFA Confederations Cup
 Runners-up (1): 2017
 Panamerican Championship
 Runners-up (1): 1952

Chronology of titles

South American tournaments 
 Copa Bernardo O'Higgins (vs ):
 Winners (2): 1957, 1966 (shared)
 Copa Teixeira (vs ):
 Winners: 1990 (shared)
 Copa Carlos Dittborn (vs ):
 Winners: 1973
 Copa Juan Pinto Durán (vs ):
 Winners (2): 1971, 1979
 Copa del Pacífico (vs ):
 Winners (7): 1965, 1968, 1971 (shared), 1983, 1988, 2006, 2012
 Copa Leoncio Provoste (vs ):
 Winners: 1973
 Copa Acosta Ñu (vs ):
 Winners: 1974

Friendlies 

 Canada Cup:
 Winners: 1995
 Copa Ciudad de Valparaíso:
 Winners: 2000
 China Cup:
Winners: 2017

Pan American Team 

Pan American Games:
  Silver medalists (1): 1987
 Bronze medalists (2): 1951, 1963

See also

Chile national under-23 football team
Chile national under-20 football team
Chile national under-17 football team
Chile national futsal team
South American Footballer of the Year

Notes

In 2010, Chicago-based rock band Manwomanchild released the song "Chile La Roja" in support of Chile's 2010 World Cup team.

References

External links

The official Chile national football team website
national football team web site on ANFP
Chile FIFA profile
RSSSF archive of results 1910–2003
RSSSF archive of most capped players and highest goalscorers

 
South American national association football teams
Football in Chile